Stefanie Mirlach is a retired German football midfielder. She last played for Turbine Potsdam in the Bundesliga. As an Under-19 international she won the 2010 U-20 World Cup.

1. FFC Turbine Potsdam

On 10 May 2012, it was announced that Mirlach will join German Bundesliga side 1. FFC Turbine Potsdam effective from 1 July 2012.

References

1990 births
Living people
German women's footballers
Women's association football midfielders
Sportspeople from Ingolstadt
Footballers from Bavaria